Paraná mammarenavirus is a species of virus in the family Arenaviridae. The rodent species Sooretamys angouya is a host of this virus.

References

Arenaviridae